Cathedral Basilica of apostles St. Peter and St. Paul of Kaunas is a Roman Catholic cathedral basilica in Kaunas, Lithuania.

History 

The exact date when the first Gothic style church dedicated to apostles Saint Peter and Saint Paul, was built is unknown, but it was first mentioned in written sources in 1413. The first parochial school in Kaunas at the St. Peter and St. Paul church was mentioned in 1473. The construction works were concluded only in 1624. 

The church greatly suffered from the 1655 military campaign and was rebuilt in 1671, gaining some Renaissance features. Only one of the towers was rebuilt after the fire of the roof in 1732. As a part of renovation, the internal decorations were funded by the King Stanisław August Poniatowski in 1771. The main altar, a lectern and a choir were installed by Tomasz Podhajski in 1775. 

The present-day shape of the building results from a further renovation in 1800. The church was promoted to cathedral status by Pope Leo XIII in 1895. It received the basilica title in 1926, when the Diocese of Samogitia was reorganized into the Metropolitan Archdiocese of Kaunas by Pope Pius XI. The building was included on the Registry of Immovable Cultural Heritage Sites of the Republic of Lithuania in 1996. Pope Francis visited the cathedral on 23. September 2018.

Architecture 
The cathedral, being 84 m long, 28 m height and 34 m wide, is the largest Gothic church in Lithuania. The Chapel of the Blessed Sacrament, built in 1895, is an independent extension of the southern nave with carved wood furnishings in the neo-gothic style.

Burials 
 Motiejus Valančius, the bishop of Samogitia, who was also an historian and one of the best known Lithuanian writers of the 19th century, was interred in a crypt of the church in 1875.
 There is also a Neogothic mausoleum of Maironis, one of the most famous Lithuanian romantic poets, near the wall of the chapel. 
 Lithuanian Cardinal Vincentas Sladkevičius was also buried in the Kaunas Cathedral Basilica in 2000.

See also
 Gothic architecture in Lithuania

References

External links 

Kaunas Cathedral Basilica website
Pilgrim Route of John Paul II. Lithuania website
Postage stamps - Lithuanian churches. Post Office of Lithuania.

Roman Catholic churches in Kaunas
Cathedral Basilica
Roman Catholic cathedrals in Lithuania
Brick Gothic
Basilica churches in Lithuania
Gothic architecture in Lithuania
Objects listed in Lithuanian Registry of Cultural Property